Semyon Isaakovich Volfkovich (October 23, 1896 – November 12, 1980) was a Soviet chemist, technologist and member of the Soviet Academy of Sciences (1946). In 1941 he was awarded the Stalin Prize and in 1976 he received the Lomonosov Gold Medal.

References

1896 births
1980 deaths
20th-century Russian chemists
People from Ananyevsky Uyezd
Full Members of the USSR Academy of Sciences
Stalin Prize winners
Recipients of the Lomonosov Gold Medal
Recipients of the Order of Lenin
Recipients of the Order of the Red Banner of Labour
Russian chemists

Soviet chemists
Burials at Donskoye Cemetery